Industrial Training Institute, Howrah Homes, (also known as ITI Howrah Homes), is a government vocational training institute located in Santragachi, Howrah district,  West Bengal. This ITI offers different training courses on Carpenter, Draughtsman Civil, Draughtsman Mechanical, Surveyor, Mechanic A/C & Refrigeration, Mechanic Motor Vehicle,     Electrician, Fitter, Foundryman, Machinist, Turner, Welder, Wireman, Sheet Metal Worker.

References

Industrial Training Institute (ITI) in West Bengal